Willie Earl Williams (born July 28, 1946) is a former National Basketball Association (NBA) player. Williams lettered two years in basketball at Florida State University after two years at Miami Dade Community College.  In the 1968-69 season, Williams averaged 7.8 points and 9.6 rebounds per game. The following season, Williams averaged 16.9 points and 11.0 rebounds per game.  He was drafted with the fourth pick in the third round of the 1970 NBA Draft. After playing sixteen games with the Celtics in the 1970-71 NBA season, Williams was waived by the Celtics and then claimed off waivers by the Cincinnati Royals. In his one NBA season, Williams averaged 0.9 points and 0.9 rebounds per game.

References

1946 births
Living people
Basketball players from Miami
Boston Celtics draft picks
Boston Celtics players
Cincinnati Royals players
Florida State Seminoles men's basketball players
Forwards (basketball)
High school basketball coaches in the United States
Miami Dade Sharks men's basketball players
Sports coaches from Miami
American men's basketball players